The women's 200m individual medley events at the 2020 World Para Swimming European Open Championships were held at the Penteada Olympic Pools Complex.

Medalists

Results

SM6

SM7
Heat 1

Final

SM8

SM9

SM10

SM13

SM14

References

2020 World Para Swimming European Championships